The shortfin spiny eel (Notacanthus bonaparte), also called Bonaparte's spiny eel, is a member of the family Notacanthidae, the deep-sea spiny eels, which are not true eels (Anguilliformes).

Distribution

The shortfin spiny eel lives in the Eastern Atlantic and Mediterranean Sea; it has been found in the Adriatic Sea.

Description 

It has a short snout, long head, mouth on the underside. Its dorsal fin has up to nine spines, while the anal fin is long and has up to fourteen spines. Males are smaller and have enlarged nasal rosettes.

Behaviour

The shortfin spiny eel feeds on bryozoans, ophiuroids, amphipods and sponges.

Life cycle 
The shortfin spiny eel spawns in June and July in the Mediterranean.

References

 

Notacanthidae
Fish described in 1840